A list of films produced in Spain in 1953 (see 1953 in film).

1953

External links
 Spanish films of 1953 at the Internet Movie Database

1953
Spanish
Films